Fritz Vogelsang (born 17 November 1932) is a Swiss athlete. He competed in the men's decathlon at the 1960 Summer Olympics.

References

External links
 

1932 births
Living people
Athletes (track and field) at the 1960 Summer Olympics
Swiss decathletes
Olympic athletes of Switzerland
People from Aarau
Sportspeople from Aargau